The Asia/Oceania Zone was one of the three zones of the regional Davis Cup competition in 1995.

In the Asia/Oceania Zone there were three different tiers, called groups, in which teams competed against each other to advance to the upper tier. Winners in Group III advanced to the Asia/Oceania Zone Group II in 1996. All other teams remained in Group III.

Participating nations

Draw
 Venue: Dubai Creek Golf & Yacht Club, Dubai, United Arab Emirates
 Date: 10–16 April

Group A

Group B

  and  promoted to Group II in 1996.

Group A

Bahrain vs. Syria

Kazakhstan vs. Oman

Kuwait vs. Singapore

Brunei vs. Syria

Kazakhstan vs. Singapore

Kuwait vs. Oman

Bahrain vs. Brunei

Kazakhstan vs. Kuwait

Oman vs. Singapore

Bahrain vs. Kazakhstan

Brunei vs. Oman

Kuwait vs. Syria

Bahrain vs. Kuwait

Brunei vs. Singapore

Kazakhstan vs. Syria

Bahrain vs. Oman

Brunei vs. Kazakhstan

Singapore vs. Syria

Bahrain vs. Singapore

Brunei vs. Kuwait

Oman vs. Syria

Group B

United Arab Emirates vs. Pacific Oceania

Bangladesh vs. Jordan

Saudi Arabia vs. Lebanon

United Arab Emirates vs. Bangladesh

Jordan vs. Saudi Arabia

Lebanon vs. Pacific Oceania

United Arab Emirates vs. Saudi Arabia

Bangladesh vs. Pacific Oceania

Jordan vs. Lebanon

United Arab Emirates vs. Lebanon

Bangladesh vs. Saudi Arabia

Jordan vs. Pacific Oceania

United Arab Emirates vs. Jordan

Bangladesh vs. Lebanon

Saudi Arabia vs. Pacific Oceania

References

External links
Davis Cup official website

Davis Cup Asia/Oceania Zone
Asia Oceania Zone Group III